Wesley da Conceição Duarte Moreira (born 2 June 2002), commonly known as Wesley, is a Brazilian professional footballer who plays as a right-winger and left-winger for Campeonato Brasileiro Série A club Grêmio.

Club career

Grêmio
Born in Encruzilhada do Sul, Brazil, Wesley joined the Grêmio's Academy at the age of 12 in 2010.

Career statistics

Club

Honours
Grêmio
Campeonato Gaúcho: 2022

References

External links

Profile at the Grêmio F.B.P.A. website

2002 births
Living people
Brazilian footballers
Association football defenders
Campeonato Brasileiro Série A players
Grêmio Foot-Ball Porto Alegrense players